John McGarvie Smith (8 February 1844 – 6 September 1918) was an Australian metallurgist, bacteriologist and benefactor.

Biography

Smith was born in Sydney, the eldest surviving of thirteen children of Scots parents David Milne Smith, tailor of Old South Head Road, and his wife Isabella, née Young. Baptised as John Smith by the Rev. John McGarvie, Smith added 'McGarvie' to his name. At 13 years of age Smith was apprenticed and learned the trade of watchmaker and jeweller; by 1867 he opened a business for himself at Sydney which he continued for about 20 years. Smith took up photography, which led to his studying chemistry at the University of Sydney from 1867, and later, metallurgy. Smith began work an assayer and metallurgist in the mid-1880s. He developed improvements in the treatment of refractory ores and his advice was of great value in dealing with problems of this kind at the Sunny Corner mining-field and at Broken Hill. At Mount Morgan, Queensland, he did important work in connection with the chlorine process of extracting gold.

Smith took up the study of bacteriology at the suggestion of his friend James Frederick Elliott, and did a large amount of research endeavouring to find a vaccine against the effects of snake bite. He collected a large number of venomous snakes which he handled himself when extracting their venom. Smith eventually came to the conclusion that it was bacteriologically impossible to inoculate against snake-bite, but while carrying out his investigations he collected a large amount of information about the relative virulence of the venom of Australian snakes.

His most important research was in connection with anthrax. Louis Pasteur had discovered a vaccine, which, however, would not keep, and Smith after long experimenting found an effective vaccine which would keep for an indefinite period. This he treated as a business secret for many years, but a few months before his death he handed the formula to representatives of the New South Wales government. Smith also gave £10,000 to endow a 'McGarvie Smith Institute'. While making his investigations Smith travelled extensively in Europe and the United States and visited many laboratories. He was a man of great determination and remarkable personality.

All his life he had a passion for work, but he spared time in his youth to become a good rifle shot. Smith married Adelaide Elizabeth née Hoalls on 7 July 1877, the widow of Daniel Deniehy, who died in 1908. Smith died at his home in the Sydney suburb of Woollahra of influenza.  He was buried at the Waverley Cemetery.

References

1844 births
1918 deaths
Australian scientists
Woollahra, New South Wales
John McGarvie Smith (scientist)
Deaths from pneumonia in Australia